Moratuwa is a large suburb of Colombo, on the southwestern coast of Sri Lanka, near Dehiwala-Mount Lavinia. Moratuwa is surrounded on three sides by water, except in the north of the city, by the Indian Ocean on the west, the Lake Bolgoda on the east and the Moratu river on the south. According to the 2012 census, the suburb had a population of 168,280.

Moratuwa is also the birthplace of Veera Puran Appu, a resistance fighter against British rule in Matale, the philanthropist Sir Charles Henry de Soysa and the musician Pandit W. D. Amaradeva.

Suburb structure 
Moratuwa consists of 24 main areas: Angulana, Borupana, Dahampura, Egoda Uyana, Idama, Indibedda, Kadalana, Kaduwamulla, Kaldemulla, Katubedda, Katukurunda, Koralawella, Lakshapathiya, Lunawa, Molpe, Moratumulla, Moratuwella, Puwakaramba, Rawathawatta, Soysapura, Thelawala, Uswatta, Uyana and Willorawatta.

History 

Both Moratuwa and Lakshapathiya are mentioned in the 15th century poem Kokila Sandesha, written by a monk poet of Devundara to celebrate Prince Sapumal during the reign of King Parakramabahu VI. Lunawa, Uyana and Rawathawatte are mentioned in 16th century chronicles and church records of martyrs, the latter commemorates Revatha Thera, the chief incumbent of a temple built by King Vijayabahu I. Lakshapathiya, meaning commanding a hundred-thousand, was once the land awarded to Lak Vijaya Singu, a Commander of King Nissanka Malla. Subsequent to the Wijayaba Kollaya and the division of the Kotte Kingdom, the hamlet of Koralawella was created as part of Raigam Korale, which again became part of Moratuwa in 1735, however losing Ratmalana and parts of Borupane to Dehiwala. The name Moratuwa is derived from "Mura Atuwa" meaning sentry turret in Sinhalese which once existed at Kaldamulla.

Industries 
Industries in Moratuwa include the manufacture of furniture, rubber products, batteries, transformers, and wood handicrafts. This suburb is also a fishing and trading center. Of these, Moratuwa is most well known for its furniture.

Education 
The University of Moratuwa, a leading technological university in South Asia is situated on the banks of the Bolgoda Lake in Katubedda, Moratuwa. High schools in the area include Moratu Maha Vidyalaya, Prince of Wales' College, Princess of Wales' College, Our Lady of Victories Convent, St. Sebastian's College and the Methodist High School.

Attractions 
The Bolgoda lake situated in Moratuwa is the largest natural lake of Sri Lanka. It is a tributary of the Kalu Ganga which originates at Adam's Peak and is a popular resort for swimming, angling and boating. Bolgoda lake spreads, twisting from Ratmalana via Moratuwa and Panadura till it meets the sea at Wadduwa and Moratuwa via the Moratu ganga. Moratuwa is home to the oldest church dedicated to St. Sebastian and the Holy Emmanuel Church, which was once the tallest building in Sri Lanka. A monument to Puran Appu stands in the premises of the Moratuwa Municipal Council and a museum is housed at the Weera Puran Appu Vidyalaya.

Music 
Moratuwa is famous for its music and is home to some well-known musicians such as W. D. Amaradeva, C.T. Fernando, M. S. Fernando, Nihal Nelson, Priya Peiris (La Bambas), Sunil Perera (The Gypsies) and Niranjala Sarojini.

The town also has a famous theme song, Punsada paaya Moratuwa dillenna (meaning "Moratuwa in the splendour of the full moon"), which is a staple at most musical events held in Moratuwa.
Clarence Wijewardena also composed Moratuwa Moratuwa mea nomakena nama song in tribute to the town.

Sport 
Moratuwa is famous for its notable cricket players, such as Duleep Mendis, Susil Fernando Roger Wijesuriya Ajantha Mendis, Amal Silva, Romesh Kaluwitharana, Lahiru Thirimanne, Prasanna Jayawardene, Angelo Perera, Kusal Mendis, Vishwa Fernando, Amila Aponso, Avishka Fernando, and Sadeera Samarawickrama

An international cricket stadium, De Soysa Stadium (Tyronne Fernando Stadium) is situated in Moratuwa.

Demographics 

Moratuwa consisting of all ethnic and religious groups seen in Sri Lanka. This suburb has a percentage Christian population after Negombo city, significantly higher than the national average.

Public library 
The Public library of Moratuwa Municipal Council “Janasetha Kala Ketha” at Galle Road, Katubedda, Moratuwa, Sri Lanka was opened in 1987. This was constructed by the funds raised by Moratuwa municipal council to the amount of rupees 15 laks and 50 laks by the Japanese organization “World Exposition Commemorative”. The library was constructed according to Japanese architecture. Among the other facilities provided by the main library are art and stories hour and Tamil language hour for children, Computer classes for children and adults, conference, lectures etc. Every year the library celebrates the literature month (September) and National reading month (October), conducting various activities to develop reading habits among the children. Janasetha Kala Ketha, the public library of Moratuwa, has been awarded as The Best Public Library in Colombo district in the years 2012 and 2013 and as The Best Public Library in the Western Province of the Island in 2012.

Transport 

The main road transport link to Moratuwa is the Colombo-Galle Highway (Galle Road), which links the suburb from the north and south. Moratuwa is linked to the outside by four bridges, old Moratuwa Bridge at the town centre, New Galle Road Bridge at Modara, Kospalana Bridge and Borupana Road Bridge, all across the Bolgoda lake. The town is linked by Galle Road to the north at Ratmalana, to Panadura to the south and to Pilyandala in the east. Access to the Southern Expressway from Moratuwa is  either through Kottawa or by Horana Road.

The coastal railway line from Colombo to Matara runs through Moratuwa along the coast. Railway stations at Angulana, Lunawa, Moratuwa, Koralawella and Egodauyana serve residents of Moratuwa.

References

Maps 
Detailed map of Moratuwa vicinity and Sri Lanka

External links 
 Puran Appu
 Moratuwa City Details

 
Populated places in Colombo District
Populated places in Western Province, Sri Lanka